Nazira Farah Sarkis is a Syrian politician and the State Minister for Environment Affairs of Syria. She is an ethnic Armenian.

Early life
Nazira Farah Sarkis was born in 1962 in Aleppo, Syria. She completed her B.A in Chemical Sciences and Masters in Analytical Chemistry. She also has a diploma in Analytical Chemistry. He finished her Phd from University of Aleppo in Chemical Sciences.

Career
Nazira Farah Sarkis was worked in the Pharmacy College at University of Aleppo where she was the head of the teachers' Union. She was the head of the Analytical Chemistry Department at University of Aleppo. She was appointed the Minister of Environment Affairs in 23 June 2012 by President Bashar al-Assad. She has been added to the Specially Designated Nationals by the Office of Foreign Assets Control of the United States along with other Syrian government officials. In 11 May 2015 she organized the Energy - Make it Bird- friendly in collaboration with the Syrian Society for the Conservation of Wildlife in the National Museum Hall in Damascus, Syria.

References

1962 births
University of Aleppo alumni
Syrian people of Armenian descent
People from Aleppo
Arab Socialist Ba'ath Party – Syria Region politicians
Living people